Karl Glusman (born January 3, 1988) is an American actor. He had a lead role in Gaspar Noé’s controversial pornographical drama Love (2015) and appeared in The Neon Demon (2016) and Nocturnal Animals (2016).

Early life
Glusman was born in The Bronx, New York City. His family moved to the Portland, Oregon area when he was six months old. His father is German-Jewish and his mother is Irish Catholic. He also has French, Finnish, German, Spanish and Swedish ancestry.  He attended Lake Oswego High School and then enrolled at Portland State University, but dropped out after a year. Aspiring to be an actor, he took acting courses while in college and at the Portland Actors Conservatory. He later attended the William Esper Studio in New York City.

Career
After shooting a television commercial for Adidas, Glusman relocated to France. There Argentine-French film director Gaspar Noé cast Glusman in Love, a film depicting extensive unsimulated sex. It debuted at the 2015 Cannes Film Festival. The premier set a record for the festival, selling all 2,200 seats in the Palais des Festivals et des Congrès. In Cannes, Glusman met film director and fashion designer Tom Ford, who cast him in  Nocturnal Animals (2016). Also in 2016, Glusman appeared in Nicolas Winding Refn's thriller The Neon Demon. In 2020 he appeared alongside Tom Hanks in Aaron Schneider's Greyhound.

Personal life
In 2016, Glusman began a relationship with actress Zoë Kravitz. Kravitz revealed in an interview published in October 2018 that she had become engaged in February of that year. They were married June 29, 2019 at the Paris, France, home of Kravitz's father, musician Lenny Kravitz. Kravitz filed for divorce on December 23, 2020, after 18 months of marriage. The divorce was finalized in August 2021.

Filmography

Television

References

External links

1988 births
Living people
21st-century American male actors
American people of German-Jewish descent
American people of Irish descent
Jewish American male actors
Male actors from New York City
Male actors from Oregon
Male actors from Portland, Oregon
People from Lake Oswego, Oregon
21st-century American Jews